Facial symmetry is one specific measure of bodily symmetry. Along with traits such as averageness and youthfulness it influences judgments of aesthetic traits of physical attractiveness and beauty. For instance, in mate selection, people have been shown to have a preference for symmetry.

Facial bilateral symmetry is typically defined as fluctuating asymmetry of the face comparing random differences in facial features of the two sides of the face. The human face also has systematic, directional asymmetry: on average, the face (mouth, nose and eyes) sits systematically to the left with respect to the axis through the ears, the so-called aurofacial asymmetry.

Directional asymmetry
Directional asymmetry is a systematic asymmetry of some parts of the face across the population. A theory of directional asymmetries in the human body is the axial twist hypothesis. As predicted by this theory, the eyes, nose and mouth are, on average, located slightly to the left of the axis through the ears. This aurofacial asymmetry is very small in young adults (0.5 degree), but much larger in small children (4 degrees).

Fluctuating asymmetry

Fluctuating asymmetry is the non-systematic variation of individual facial landmarks with respect to the facial midline, i.e., the line perpendicular to the line through the eyes, which crosses the tip of the nose and the chin.

A wide variety of methods have been used to examine the claim that facial symmetry plays a role in judgments of beauty. Blending of multiple faces to create a composite and face-half mirroring have been among the techniques used.

Conclusions derived from face mirroring, however, have been called into question, because it has been shown that mirroring face-halves creates artificial features. For example, if the nose of an individual is slightly bent to the right side, then mirroring the right side of the face will lead to an over-sized nose, while mirroring the left side will lead to an unnaturally small nose.

Attractiveness
Facial symmetry has been found to increase ratings of attractiveness in human faces. More symmetrical faces are perceived as more attractive in both males and females, although facial symmetry plays a larger role in judgments of attractiveness concerning female faces.

While studies employing the composite faces produced results that indicate that more symmetrical faces are perceived as more attractive, studies applying the face-half mirroring technique have indicated that humans prefer slight asymmetry. Also, studies have shown that nearly symmetrical faces are considered highly attractive as compared to asymmetrical ones. The symmetry of the nose seems to be more important than that of the lips.

Dynamic asymmetries
Highly conspicuous directional asymmetries can be temporary ones. For example, during speech, most people (76%) tend to express greater amplitude of movement on the right side of their mouth. This is most likely caused by the uneven strengths of contralateral neural connections between the left hemisphere of the brain (linguistic localization) and the right side of the face.

Facial averageness vs. symmetry
Experiments suggest that symmetry and averageness make independent contributions to attractiveness.

Aging
Facial symmetry is also a valid marker of cognitive aging. Progressive changes occurring throughout life in the soft tissues of the face will cause more prominent facial asymmetry in older faces. Therefore, symmetrical transformation of older faces generally increases their attractiveness while symmetrical transformation in young adults and children will decrease their attractiveness.

Personality and Big Five personality traits

Research indicates that facial symmetry is correlated with the 'big-five' model of personality. The five factors are:
 Openness to experience (inventive/curious vs. consistent/cautious)
 Conscientiousness (efficient/organized vs. easy-going/careless)
 Extraversion (outgoing/energetic vs. solitary/reserved)
 Agreeableness (friendly/compassionate vs. challenging/detached)
 Neuroticism (sensitive/nervous vs. secure/confident)

A consistent finding is that facial symmetry is positively correlated with extraversion, indicating that individuals with more symmetric faces are also more extroverted.  More symmetrical faces are also judged to be lower on neuroticism but higher on conscientiousness and agreeableness (asymmetrical faces were rated as less agreeable than normal ones, but the more symmetrical were again rated as somewhat less agreeable than the normal).  More symmetrical faces are also more likely to have more desirable social attributes assigned to them, such as sociable, intelligent or lively.

However, the relationship of facial symmetry and the 'big-five' personality model remains somewhat unclear with regard to neuroticism, openness, agreeableness and conscientiousness.  Openness and agreeableness appear to be significantly negatively related to facial symmetry, while neuroticism and conscientiousness do not seem to be linked to facial symmetry.  With respect to trustworthiness it has been found that the facial muscles become imbalanced when lying.

Evolution and sexual selection
Sexual selection is a theoretical construct within evolution theory. According to sexual selection, mate choice can have profound influence on the preferred features. Sexual selection can only influence features that potential mates can perceive, such as smell, audition (e.g. song) and vision. Such features might be reliable indicators of hidden fitness parameters such as a good immune system or developmental stability.

It has been argued that more symmetric faces are preferred because symmetry might be a reliable sign of such hidden fitness parameters. However it is possible that high facial symmetry in an individual is not due to their superior genetics but due to a lack of exposure to stressors, such as alcohol, during prenatal development.

It has been found that more symmetrical faces are rated as healthier than less symmetrical faces. Indeed, facial symmetry was found to be positively associated with the perceived healthiness of the facial skin. Also, facial asymmetry was found to be correlated with physiological, psychological and emotional distress.

Some evidence suggests that face preferences in adults might be correlated to infections in childhood.

See also
 Beauty
 Symmetry in nature
 Patterns in nature
 Physical attractiveness

References

External links
 FaceResearch – Online studies on facial symmetry by researchers affiliated with University of Aberdeen (Scotland) School of Psychology, and University of St. Andrews (Scotland).
 "A facial symmetry plugin for the GIMP"—Try experimenting with facial symmetry, using open source software.
 "Psychological Image Collection at Stirling (PICS) Free Database of pictures of faces
 "FaceBase An interdisciplinary research consortium for facial symmetry
 "Tübinger Face Database An open research database of 200 merged 3-D faces
 "A facial symmetry app for iPhone Experiment with facial symmetry, using a free iPhone app.
Body shape
Facial features
Physical attractiveness
Anthropometry
Symmetry